This is a list of all genera, species and subspecies of the family Tropidophiidae, otherwise referred to as dwarf boas or tropidophiids. It follows the taxonomy currently provided by ITIS, which is based on the continuing work of Dr. Roy McDiarmid.

 Exiliboa, Oaxacan dwarf boa
 Exiliboa placata, Oaxacan dwarf boa
 Trachyboa, Eyelash boas
 Trachyboa boulengeri, Northern eyelash boa
 Trachyboa gularis, Ecuadorian eyelash boa
 Tropidophis, Wood snakes
 Tropidophis battersbyi, Ecuadorian dwarf boa
 Tropidophis bucculentus, Navassa Island dwarf boa
 Tropidophis canus, Bahamian dwarf boa
 Tropidophis canus androsi, Andros Island dwarf boa
 Tropidophis canus barbouri, Eastern Bahama Islands dwarf boa
 Tropidophis canus canus, Great Inagua Island dwarf boa
 Tropidophis canus curtus, Bimini Island dwarf boa
 Tropidophis caymanensis, Cayman Islands dwarf boa
 Tropidophis caymanensis caymanensis, Grand Cayman dwarf boa
 Tropidophis caymanensis parkeri, Little Cayman dwarf boa
 Tropidophis caymanensis schwartzi, Cayman Brac Island dwarf boa
 Tropidophis feicki, Broad-banded dwarf boa
 Tropidophis fuscus, Cuban dusky dwarf boa
 Tropidophis greenwayi, Caicos dwarf boa
 Tropidophis greenwayi greenwayi, Caicos Island dwarf boa
 Tropidophis greenwayi lanthanus, Ambergris Cay dwarf boa
 Tropidophis haetianus, Haitian dwarf boa
 Tropidophis haetianus haetianus, Haitian dwarf boa
 Tropidophis haetianus hemerus, East Hispaniola dwarf boa
 Tropidophis haetianus jamaicensis, Southern Jamaican dwarf boa
 Tropidophis haetianus stejnegeri, Northern Jamaican eyespot dwarf boa
 Tropidophis haetianus stullae, Portland Ridge dwarf boa
 Tropidophis haetianus tiburonensis, Tiburon dwarf boa
 Tropidophis maculatus, Spotted red dwarf boa
 Tropidophis melanurus, Cuban giant dwarf boa
 Tropidophis melanurus dysodes, Isla de Pinos dwarf boa
 Tropidophis melanurus ericksoni, Juventud dwarf boa
 Tropidophis melanurus melanurus, Cuban black-tailed dwarf boa
 Tropidophis nigriventris, Black-bellied dwarf boa
 Tropidophis nigriventris hardyi, Hardy's black-bellied dwarf boa
 Tropidophis nigriventris nigriventris, Cuban black-bellied dwarf boa
 Tropidophis pardalis, Leopard dwarf boa
 Tropidophis paucisquamis, Brazilian dwarf boa
 Tropidophis pilsbryi, Cuban White-necked dwarf boa
 Tropidophis pilsbryi galacelidus, Sierra de Trinidad dwarf boa
 Tropidophis pilsbryi pilsbryi, Pilsbry's dwarf boa
 Tropidophis semicinctus, Yellow-banded dwarf boa
 Tropidophis taczanowskyi, Taczanowski's dwarf boa
 Tropidophis wrighti, Gracile banded
 Ungaliophis, Bromeliad boas
 Ungaliophis continentalis, Chiapan boa
 Ungaliophis panamensis, Panamanian dwarf boa

References

 
Tropidophiidae
Tropidophiidae